Dana Trent (née Lewman / lumən / ; born April 11, 1981), known professionally as J. Dana Trent, is an American author, teacher, and minister . Trent is a full-time Humanities faculty member at Wake Tech Community College in Raleigh, North Carolina. She is the author of four books: Saffron Cross: The Unlikely Story of How a Christian Minister Married a Hindu Monk (2013), For Sabbath's Sake: Embracing Your Need for Rest, Worship, and Community (2017),  One Breath at a Time: A Skeptic's Guide to Christian Meditation (2019), and Dessert First: Preparing for Death While Savoring Life (2019).

Early life 
Trent's father, Richard Lewman, was a recreational therapist diagnosed with schizoaffective disorder. Her mother had mental illness too. The couple met in a locked inpatient psychiatric institute four years before she was born. Her parents followed televangelist Robert Schuller to Los Angeles before she was born to be near the Crystal Cathedral. They hoped Schuller's message of self-healing and self-empowerment would allow them to conceive a child. About a year later, Trent was born in Los Angeles and named for the Indiana town where her father was from. 

Trent was born in Los Angeles, and moved to Dana, Indiana as an infant. According to Religion News Service, Trent grew up in a trailer in the small town of Dana, Indiana, the daughter of parents who sold and used drugs. Trent’s father trained her in the drug business; her street name was “Budgie.” The name is a label given to parakeets. She lived in Indiana until age six, when her parents divorced and she moved with her mother to North Carolina.  Trent attended Reidsville High School in Reidsville, North Carolina, and won a Rockingham Community College sponsored speech contest for high schoolers in 1996. She was the 1998 winner of the “I Dare You Leadership Award.”

Podcast 
Trent first publicly shared her drug-trafficking upbringing in “Breaking Good,” a podcast produced in conjunction with the Lilly Endowment-funded Louisville Institute. Trent is writing a book version of the podcast that will tell the story in greater depth. Her agent is Mark Tauber.

Controversy 
Trent is one of only 2,500 women total ordained in the Southern Baptist tradition. She is publicly critical of Beth Moore, criticizing Moore's stance on complementarianism. On State of Belief with Welton Gaddy, Trent questioned Moore's apology and timing of leaving the Southern Baptist Convention. Trent says that Moore was unwilling to abandon complementarianism all together, suggesting that Moore believes there are circumstances in which complementarianism is appropriate and that Moore benefits from a "neutral posture" on complementarianism.

Career 
Trent is one of the few female ordained Southern Baptist ministers in the United States. She graduated from Duke Divinity School with a Master of Divinity in 2006. After graduating from Duke at the age of 25, she served as a UNC Health intensive care resident chaplain where she worked with terminal patients and bore witness to 200 deaths in one year. Publishers Weekly called Trent's fourth book, Dessert First, “hilarious and poignant.” According to Englewood Review of Books, Dessert First decidedly is not a treatise expounding traditional Christian views on death. Trent’s focus instead is starting the conversation about death early and often, regardless of the reader’s faith background.

Trent is a community college instructor who helps young adults process death and grief in using the context of World Religions. In her college classroom, she helps students understand the meaning of life and grief from the perspective of religion and spirituality. During the pandemic, Trent, who is active in the Death-Positive Movement, told ABC News that Americans should consider having more candid conversations about death, loss, and grief, saying that COVID had "awakened" society to the reality of death.

Trent was often featured as a Wake Tech Community College faculty expert for CBS 17 in the areas of coping with anxiety, stress, and pandemic re-entry. She is an advocate for technology sabbaths.

Personal life 
Trent married Fred Eaker in July 2010 after meeting him on eHarmony.

Works

References 

Living people
1981 births
American Christian writers
Christian feminist theologians
Christian bloggers
American women non-fiction writers
American memoirists
Public theologians
Religion academics
Duke University alumni
Salem College alumni
Women religious writers
21st-century American memoirists
Writers from Indiana
Writers from North Carolina
American bloggers
Southern Baptist ministers
Southern Baptist Convention
People in interfaith dialogue
Interfaith marriage
Hindu writers
People from Arcadia, California
Baptists from North Carolina
Women Christian clergy